The 1970–71 NBA season was the Lakers' 23rd season in the NBA and 11th season in Los Angeles.

The Lakers would be eliminated by the eventual champions, the Milwaukee Bucks, in five games in the Western Conference Finals.

The team's season roster is featured in the video games NBA 2K16, NBA 2K17, and NBA 2K18.

Offseason

Draft picks

Roster

Regular season

Season standings

z – clinched division title
y – clinched division title
x – clinched playoff spot

Record vs. opponents

Game log

Playoffs

|- align="center" bgcolor="#ccffcc"
| 1
| March 24
| Chicago
| W 100–99
| Jim McMillian (26)
| Wilt Chamberlain (21)
| Gail Goodrich (11)
| The Forum10,726
| 1–0
|- align="center" bgcolor="#ccffcc"
| 2
| March 26
| Chicago
| W 105–95
| Gail Goodrich (29)
| Wilt Chamberlain (20)
| Gail Goodrich (7)
| The Forum13,469
| 2–0
|- align="center" bgcolor="#ffcccc"
| 3
| March 28
| @ Chicago
| L 98–106
| Gail Goodrich (39)
| Wilt Chamberlain (18)
| Goodrich, Chamberlain (6)
| Chicago Stadium10,101
| 2–1
|- align="center" bgcolor="#ffcccc"
| 4
| March 30
| @ Chicago
| L 102–112
| Gail Goodrich (32)
| Wilt Chamberlain (23)
| Wilt Chamberlain (7)
| Chicago Stadium18,650
| 2–2
|- align="center" bgcolor="#ccffcc"
| 5
| April 1
| Chicago
| W 115–89
| Gail Goodrich (33)
| Wilt Chamberlain (14)
| Gail Goodrich (11)
| The Forum13,935
| 3–2
|- align="center" bgcolor="#ffcccc"
| 6
| April 4
| @ Chicago
| L 99–113
| Gail Goodrich (25)
| Wilt Chamberlain (33)
| Wilt Chamberlain (9)
| Chicago Stadium14,211
| 3–3
|- align="center" bgcolor="#ccffcc"
| 7
| April 6
| Chicago
| W 109–98
| Gail Goodrich (29)
| Wilt Chamberlain (19)
| Goodrich, Chamberlain (9)
| The Forum17,505
| 4–3
|-

|- align="center" bgcolor="#ffcccc"
| 1
| April 9
| @ Milwaukee
| L 85–106
| Wilt Chamberlain (22)
| Wilt Chamberlain (20)
| Gail Goodrich (7)
| Milwaukee Arena10,746
| 0–1
|- align="center" bgcolor="#ffcccc"
| 2
| April 11
| @ Milwaukee
| L 73–91
| Wilt Chamberlain (26)
| Wilt Chamberlain (22)
| Gail Goodrich (4)
| Milwaukee Arena10,746
| 0–2
|- align="center" bgcolor="#ccffcc"
| 3
| April 14
| Milwaukee
| W 118–107
| four players tied (24)
| Wilt Chamberlain (24)
| Gail Goodrich (8)
| The Forum17,334
| 1–2
|- align="center" bgcolor="#ffcccc"
| 4
| April 16
| Milwaukee
| L 94–117
| Gail Goodrich (26)
| Wilt Chamberlain (16)
| Gail Goodrich (11)
| The Forum17,505
| 1–3
|- align="center" bgcolor="#ffcccc"
| 5
| April 18
| @ Milwaukee
| L 98–116
| Happy Hairston (27)
| Wilt Chamberlain (12)
| Gail Goodrich (9)
| Milwaukee Arena10,746
| 1–4
|-

Awards and records
 Jerry West, All-NBA First Team
 Jerry West, NBA All-Defensive First Team
 Jerry West, NBA All-Star Game
 Wilt Chamberlain, NBA All-Star Game

References

Los Angeles
Los Angeles Lakers seasons
Los Angle
Los Angle